Randolph Severn "Trey" Parker III (born October 19, 1969) is an American actor, animator, filmmaker, and composer. He is known for co-creating South Park (since 1997) and The Book of Mormon (2011) with his creative partner Matt Stone. Parker was interested in film and music as a child and at high school and attended the University of Colorado Boulder, where he met Stone. The two collaborated on various short films. They also co-wrote and co-starred in the feature-length musical Cannibal! The Musical (1993).

Parker and Stone moved to Los Angeles and wrote their second film, Orgazmo (1997). Before the premiere of the film, South Park premiered on Comedy Central in August 1997. The duo possess full creative control of the show, and have produced music and video games based on it. A film based on the series, South Park: Bigger, Longer & Uncut (1999), received good reviews from both critics and fans. Parker went on to write, produce, direct, and star in the satirical action film Team America: World Police (2004), and, after several years of development, The Book of Mormon premiered on Broadway to good reviews.

Parker has received five Primetime Emmy Awards for his work on South Park, four Tony Awards and a Grammy Award for The Book of Mormon, and an Academy Award nomination for the song "Blame Canada" from the South Park: Bigger, Longer & Uncut movie, co-written with Marc Shaiman.

Early life
Parker was born in Conifer, Colorado, the son of insurance saleswoman Sharon and geologist Randolph "Randy" Parker. He was a shy child who received "decent" grades and was involved in honors classes. He idolized Monty Python, which he began watching on television in the third grade. His later ventures into animation would bear considerable influence from Terry Gilliam. In the sixth grade, Parker wrote a sketch titled The Dentist and appeared in his school's talent show. He played the dentist and had a friend play the patient. The plot involved what can go wrong at the dentist; due to the amounts of fake blood involved, Parker's parents were called and were upset, with Parker later recalling that "the kindergartners were all crying and freaking out".

Parker has described himself as "the typical big-dream kid" who envisioned a career in film and music. He made short films on the weekends with a group of friends, beginning when he was 14. His father had purchased him a video camera and the group continued making films until graduation. He became interested in pursuing music at 17, but only comedy-centered songs; he wrote and recorded a full-length comedy album, Immature: A Collection of Love Ballads For The '80's Man, with friend David Goodman during this time. As a teenager, Parker developed a love for musical theatre, and joined the Evergreen Players, a venerable mountain community theater outside of Denver. At 14, he performed his first role as chorus member in The Best Little Whorehouse in Texas and Flower Drum Song and went on to also design sets for the community theater's production of Little Shop of Horrors. In high school, he also played piano for the chorus and was president of the choir counsel. As Evergreen was nationally known for its choir program, Parker was a very popular high school student, connected to his position as the head of the choir. He was typically the lead in school plays and was also prom king. While in school, Parker had a part-time job at a Pizza Hut and was described as a film geek and music buff.

Following his graduation from Evergreen High School in 1988, Parker spent a semester at Berklee College of Music before transferring to the University of Colorado Boulder. Parker majored in both film and Japanese. During his time there, he took a film class in which students were required to collaborate on projects. In the course, he met Matt Stone—a math major from the nearby town of Littleton—and the two immediately bonded over provocative, anti-authoritarian humor and Monty Python. Parker's first film was titled Giant Beavers of Southern Sri Lanka (1989), parodying Godzilla-style rampages with beavers; fellow student Jason McHugh later remarked that the idea nearly got him laughed out of class. Parker and Stone wrote and acted in many short films together, among those First Date, Man on Mars and Job Application. Parker later remarked that he and Stone would shoot a film nearly every week, but he has since lost most of them. Parker first used a construction paper animation technique on American History (1992), a short film made for his college animation class. It became an unexpected sensation, resulting in Parker's first award—a Student Academy Award. Parker recalled sitting in the auditorium in front of students from animation schools such as CalArts, saying, "And there are all these Cal Arts kids behind me who had submitted these beautiful watercolor and pencil things. And here's my shitty construction-paper thing-which makes South Park look like Disney, by the way, and they're all fuming". He graduated with a double-major Bachelor of Arts degree in 1993.

Career

Career beginnings

Cannibal! The Musical (1992–1994)
In 1992, Parker, Stone, McHugh, and Ian Hardin founded a production company named the Avenging Conscience, named after the D. W. Griffith film by the same name, which all four actively disliked. Parker again employed the cutout paper technique on Avenging Conscience's first production, Jesus vs. Frosty (1992), an animated short pitting the religious figure against Frosty the Snowman.

The quartet created a three-minute trailer for a fictional film titled Alferd Packer: The Musical. The idea was based on an obsession Parker had with Alferd Packer, a real nineteenth-century prospector accused of cannibalism. During this time, Parker had become engaged to long-time girlfriend Liane Adamo, but their relationship fell apart shortly before production on the trailer had begun. "Horribly depressed", Parker funneled his frustrations with her into the project, naming Packer's "beloved but disloyal" horse after her. The trailer became somewhat of a sensation among students at the school, leading Virgil Grillo, the chairman and founder of the university's film department, to convince the quartet to expand it to a feature-length film. Parker wrote the film's script, creating an Oklahoma!-style musical featuring ten original show tunes. The group raised $125,000 from family and friends and began shooting the film. The film was shot on Loveland Pass as winter was ending, and the crew endured the freezing weather. Parker—under the pseudonym Juan Schwartz—was the film's star, director and co-producer.

Alferd Packer: The Musical premiered in Boulder in October 1993; "they rented a limousine that circled to ferry every member of the cast and crew from the back side of the block to the red carpet at the theater's entrance." The group submitted the film to the Sundance Film Festival, who did not respond. Parker told McHugh he had a "vision" they needed to be at the festival, which resulted in the group renting out a conference room in a nearby hotel and putting on their own screenings. MTV did a short news segment on The Big Picture regarding the film, and they made industry connections through the festival. They intended to sell video rights to the film for $1 million and spend the remaining $900,000 to create another film. The film was instead sold to Troma Entertainment in 1996 where it was retitled Cannibal! The Musical, and upon the duo's later success, it became their biggest-selling title. It has since been labeled a "cult classic" and adapted into a stage play by community theater groups and even high schools nationwide.

The Spirit of Christmas and Orgazmo (1995–1997)

Following the film's success, the group, sans Hardin, moved to Los Angeles. Upon arrival, they met a lawyer for the William Morris Agency who connected them with producer Scott Rudin. As a result, the duo acquired a lawyer, an agent, and a script deal. Despite initially believing themselves to be on the verge of success, the duo struggled for several years. Stone slept on dirty laundry for upwards of a year because he could not afford to purchase a mattress. They unsuccessfully pitched a children's program titled Time Warped to Fox Kids, which would have involved fictionalized stories of people in history. The trio created two separate pilots, spaced a year apart, and despite the approval of Fox Broadcasting Company development executive Pam Brady, the network disbanded the Fox Kids division.

David Zucker, who was a fan of Cannibal!, contacted the duo to produce a 15-minute short film for Seagram to show at a party for its acquisition of Universal Studios. Due to a misunderstanding, Parker and Stone improvised much of the film an hour before it was shot, creating it as a spoof of 1950s instructional videos. The result, Your Studio and You, features numerous celebrities, including Sylvester Stallone, Demi Moore, and Steven Spielberg. "You could probably make a feature film out of the experience of making that movie because it was just two dudes from college suddenly directing Steven Spielberg," Parker later remarked, noting that the experience was difficult for the two.

During the time between shooting the pilots for Time Warped, Parker penned the script for a film titled Orgazmo, which later entered production. Half of the budget for the picture came from a Japanese porn company called Kuki, who wanted to feature its performers in mainstream Western media. Independent distributor October Films purchased the rights to the film for one million dollars after its screening at the Toronto International Film Festival. The film received an NC-17 rating from the Motion Picture Association of America, which resulted in the poor box office performance of the film. Parker and Stone attempted to negotiate with the organization on what to delete from the final print, but the MPAA would not give specific notes. The duo later theorized that the organization cared less because it was an independent distributor which would bring it significantly less money.

Parker and Stone also made a short film called The Spirit of Christmas (although it is now usually called Jesus vs. Frosty). Brian Graden (then at Fox) liked this short and asked Parker and Stone to produce a video greeting card (for which he paid with his own money) he could send to friends, this film is now usually known as Jesus vs. Santa. Both Jesus vs. Frosty and Jesus vs. Santa had The Spirit of Christmas as opening credits. Graden sent the film on VHS to several industry executives in Hollywood; meanwhile, someone digitized the short film and put it on Internet, where it became one of the first viral videos. As Jesus vs. Santa became more popular, Parker and Stone began talks of developing the short into a television series called South Park. They first pitched the show to Fox, but the network refused to pick it up due to not wanting to air a show that included the talking poo character Mr. Hankey. The two were initially skeptical of possible television deals, noting that previous endeavors had not turned out successful, but then entered negotiations with both MTV and Comedy Central. Parker preferred the show be produced by Comedy Central, fearing that MTV would turn it into a kids show. When Comedy Central executive Doug Herzog watched the short, he commissioned for it to be developed into a series.

South Park

Premiere and initial success (1997–1998)
The pilot episode of South Park was made on a budget of $300,000, and took between three to three and a half months to complete, and animation took place in a small room at Celluloid Studios, in Denver, Colorado, during the summer of 1996. Similarly to Parker and Stone's Christmas shorts, the original pilot was animated entirely with traditional cut paper stop-motion animation techniques. The idea for the town of South Park came from the real Colorado basin of the same name where, according to the creators, a lot of folklore and news reports originated about "UFO sightings, and cattle mutilations, and Bigfoot sightings."

At the time, Comedy Central had a low distribution of just 21 million subscribers. The company marketed the show aggressively before its launch, billing it as "why they created the V-chip." The resulting buzz led to the network earning an estimated $30 million in T-shirts sales alone before the first episode was even aired. South Park premiered in August 1997 and immediately became one of the most popular shows on cable television, averaging consistently between 3.5 and 5.5 million viewers. The show transformed the fledgling network into "a cable industry power almost overnight." Due to the success of the series' first six episodes, Comedy Central requested an additional seven; the series completed its first season in February 1998. An affiliate of the MTV Network until then, Comedy Central decided, in part due to the success of South Park, to have its own independent sales department. By the end of 1998, Comedy Central had sold more than $150 million worth of merchandise for the show, including T-shirts and dolls. Over the next few years, Comedy Central's viewership spiked largely due to South Park, adding 3 million new subscribers in the first half of 1998 alone, and allowed the network to sign international deals with networks in several countries.

Parker and Stone became celebrities as a result of the program's success; Parker noted that the success of South Park allowed him to pursue, for a time, a lifestyle that involved partying with women and "out-of-control binges" in Las Vegas. Their philosophy of taking every deal (which had surfaced as a result of their lack of trust in the early success of South Park) led to their appearances in films, albums, and outside script deals. Among these included BASEketball, a 1998 comedy film that became a critical and commercial flop, and rights to produce a prequel to Dumb and Dumber, which was never completed.

Bigger, Longer & Uncut and continued success  

Parker and Stone signed a deal with Comedy Central in April 1998 that contracted the duo to producing South Park episodes until 1999, gave them a slice of the lucrative spinoff merchandising the show generated within its first year, as well as an unspecified seven-figure cash bonus to bring the show to the big screen, in theaters. During the time, the team was also busy writing the second and third seasons of the series, the former of which Parker and Stone later described as "disastrous". As such, they figured the phenomenon would be over soon, and they decided to write a personal, fully committed musical. Parker and Stone fought with the MPAA to keep the film R-rated; for months the ratings board insisted on the more prohibitive NC-17. The film was only certified an R rating two weeks prior to its release, following contentious conversations between Parker/Stone, Rudin, and Paramount Pictures. Parker felt very overwhelmed and overworked during the production process of the film, especially between April and the film's opening in late June. He admitted that press coverage, which proclaimed the end of South Park was near, bothered him. South Park: Bigger, Longer & Uncut opened in cinemas in June 1999 and received critical acclaim while grossing $83 million at the box office.

Parker and Stone continue to write, direct, and voice most characters on South Park. Over time, the show has adopted a unique production process, in which an entire episode is written, animated and broadcast in one week. Parker and Stone state that subjecting themselves to a one-week deadline creates more spontaneity amongst themselves in the creative process, which they feel results in a funnier show. Although initial reviews for the show were negative in reference to its crass humor, the series has received numerous accolades, including five Primetime Emmy Awards, a Peabody Award, and numerous inclusions in various publications' lists of greatest television shows. Though its viewership is lower than it was at the height of its popularity in its earliest seasons, South Park remains one of the highest-rated series on Comedy Central. In 2012, South Park cut back from producing 14 episodes per year (seven in the spring and seven in the fall) to a single run of 10 episodes in the fall, to allow the duo to explore other projects the rest of the year. As of 2019 the show is renewed through 2022, when it will reach its twenty-sixth season. The show's twenty-third season premiered on September 25, 2019.

South Park has continued, becoming an enterprise worth hundreds of millions of dollars. The franchise has also expanded to music and video games. Comedy Central released various albums, including Chef Aid: The South Park Album and Mr. Hankey's Christmas Classics, in the late 1990s. The song "Chocolate Salty Balls" (as sung by the character Chef) was released as a single in the UK in 1998 to support the Chef Aid: The South Park Album and became a number one hit. Parker and Stone had little to do with the development of video games based on the series that were released at this time, but took full creative control of South Park: The Stick of Truth, a 2014 video game based on the series that received positive reviews and for which they shared (with Eric Fenstermaker) the 2014 Writing In A Comedy and Parker won the Performance in a Comedy, Supporting award by National Academy of Video Game Trade Reviewers (NAVGTR). Broadcast syndication rights to South Park were sold in 2003, and all episodes are available for free full-length on-demand legal streaming on the official South Park Studios website. In 2007, the duo, with the help of their lawyer, Kevin Morris, cut a 50–50 joint venture with Comedy Central on all revenue not related to television; this includes digital rights to South Park, as well as films, soundtracks, T-shirts and other merchandise, in a deal worth $75 million.

In August 2021, Parker and Stone signed a $900 million deal with ViacomCBS to renew the series for six additional series and 14 projects on Paramount+.

Television and film projects

That's My Bush! (2000–2001)
In 2000, Parker and Stone began plotting a television sitcom starring the winner of the 2000 presidential election. The duo were "95 percent sure" that Democratic candidate Al Gore would win, and tentatively titled the show Everybody Loves Al. Parker said the producers did not want to make fun of politics: the main goal was to parody sitcom tropes, such as a lovable main character, the sassy maid, and the wacky neighbor. They threw a party the night of the election with the writers, with intentions to begin writing the following Monday and shooting the show in January 2001 with the inauguration. With the confusion of whom the President would be, the show's production was pushed back. The show was filmed at Sony Pictures Studios, and was the first time Parker and Stone shot a show on a production lot.

Although That's My Bush!, which ran between April and May 2001, received a fair amount of publicity and critical notice, according to Stone and Parker, the cost per episode was too high, "about $1 million an episode." Comedy Central officially cancelled the series in August 2001 as a cost-cutting move; Stone was quoted as saying "A super-expensive show on a small cable network...the economics of it were just not going to work." Comedy Central continued the show in reruns, considering it a creative and critical success. Parker believed the show would not have survived after the September 11 attacks anyway, and Stone agreed, saying the show would not "play well". During this time, the duo also signed a deal with Shockwave.com to produce 39 animated online shorts, in which they would retain full artistic control; the result, Princess, was rejected after only two episodes.

Team America (2002–2004)
In 2002, the duo began working on Team America: World Police, a satire of big-budget action films and their associated clichés and stereotypes, with particular humorous emphasis on the global implications of the politics of the United States. The film was inspired by the 1960s British marionette series, Thunderbirds.

Starring puppets, Team America was produced using a crew of about 200 people, which sometimes required four people at a time to manipulate a marionette. Although the filmmakers hired three dozen highly skilled marionette operators, execution of some very simple acts by the marionettes proved to be very difficult, with a simple shot such as a character drinking taking a half-day to complete successfully. The deadline for the film's completion took a toll on both filmmakers, as did various difficulties in working with puppets, with Stone, who described the film as "the worst time of [my] life", resorting to coffee to work 20-hour days and sleeping pills to go to bed. The film was barely completed in time for its October release date, but reviews were positive and the film made a modest sum at the box office.

Broadway and film studio

The Book of Mormon 
Parker and Stone, alongside writer-composer Robert Lopez, began working on a musical centering on Mormonism during the production of Team America. Lopez, a fan of South Park and creator of the puppet musical Avenue Q, met with the duo after a performance of the musical, where they conceived the idea. The musical, titled The Book of Mormon: The Musical of the Church of Jesus Christ of Latter-day Saints, was worked on over a period of several years; working around their South Park schedule, they flew between New York City and Los Angeles often, first writing songs for the musical in 2006. Developmental workshops began in 2008, and the crew embarked on the first of a half-dozen workshops that would take place during the next four years. Originally, producer Scott Rudin planned to stage The Book of Mormon off-Broadway at the New York Theatre Workshop in summer 2010, but opted to premiere it directly on Broadway, "[s]ince the guys [Parker and Stone] work best when the stakes are highest."

After a frantic series of rewrites, rehearsals, and previews, The Book of Mormon premiered on Broadway at the Eugene O'Neill Theatre on March 24, 2011. The Book of Mormon received broad critical praise for the plot, score, actors' performances, direction and choreography. A cast recording of the original Broadway production became the highest-charting Broadway cast album in over four decades. The musical received nine Tony Awards, one for Best Musical, and a Grammy Award for Best Musical Theater Album. The production has since expanded to two national tours, a Chicago production, UK production, and as of 2014 Parker and Stone had confirmed that a film adaption was in pre-production.

Important Studios and future projects 

With sufficient funds from their work on South Park and The Book of Mormon, the duo announced plans to create their own production studio, Important Studios, in January 2013. The studio will approve projects ranging from films to television to theatre.

On April 13, 2016, Universal Pictures announced Trey Parker would voice the villain Balthazar Bratt in Despicable Me 3. The film, released in June 2017, was Parker's first voice role not scripted by either him or Matt Stone.

In the midst of the COVID-19 pandemic, Parker, Stone, and Peter Serafinowicz created a web series, Sassy Justice. The series uses deepfake technology to insert unrelated celebrities and politicians into the fictional world of a television reporter. The first episode was posted to YouTube on October26, 2020. The team was originally assembled for a film project that was interrupted due to the pandemic, who made the video based on a series of impressions that Serafinowicz developed of a "sassy" Donald Trump. The creators have a handful of shorter videos alongside a 15-minute first episode that may be turned into an ongoing series, film, or other type of project.

In 2021, Stone and Parker signed a $900 million deal with Paramount Global to make six additional seasons of South Park and 14 movies in the South Park universe for streaming.

On January 13, 2022, it was announced Parker will produce an untitled film with Matt Stone through their now-renamed production company Parker County and Kendrick Lamar and Dave Free's multi-disciplinary media company PGLang. It will be distributed by Paramount Pictures. The live-action film comedy, written by Vernon Chatman, addresses racial issues. Production is expected to begin in the spring of 2024.

Personal life
Parker married Emma Sugiyama in 2006. The officiant was 1970s sitcom producer Norman Lear. The marriage ended in divorce in 2008.

Parker subsequently began a relationship with Boogie Tillmon, whom he later married in 2014. Parker gained a stepson through this relationship. Their daughter, Betty Boogie Parker, was born in 2013. The couple divorced in 2019, citing irreconcilable differences. While they remain divorced, they have since reconciled to co-parent their child.

Parker resides in Los Angeles, California. He owns properties in Steamboat Springs, Colorado; Kauai, Hawaii; Seattle, Washington; and Midtown Manhattan in New York City.

In a September 2006 edition of the ABC News program Nightline, Parker expressed his views on religion, stating that he believes in "a God" and that "there is knowledge that humanity does not yet possess" while cautioning that it would take a long time to explain exactly what he meant by his belief in God. Parker believes all religions are "silly". He stated: "All the religions are super funny to me... The story of Jesus makes no sense to me. God sent His only Son. Why could God only have one son and why would He have to die? It's just bad writing, really. And it's really terrible in about the second act." Parker further remarked, <blockquote>Basically... out of all the ridiculous religion stories which are greatly, wonderfully ridiculous—the silliest one I've ever heard is, 'Yeah... there's this big giant universe and it's expanding, it's all gonna collapse on itself and we're all just here just 'cause... just 'cause'''. That, to me, is the most ridiculous explanation ever.</blockquote>

A 2001 Los Angeles Times article described Parker as "not overly political" and quoted him as saying he was "a registered Libertarian". In 2004, Parker summed up his views with the comment:

What we're sick of—and it's getting even worse—is: you either like Michael Moore or you wanna fuckin' go overseas and shoot Iraqis. There can't be a middle ground. Basically, if you think Michael Moore's full of shit, then you are a super-Christian right-wing whatever. And we're both just pretty middle-ground guys. We find just as many things to rip on on the left as we do on the right. People on the far left and the far right are the same exact person to us.

Discography
 Albums 
 Soundtrack albums 

 Cast recording 

Songwriting and other appearances

Filmography and accolades

 Cannibal! The Musical (1993)
 Orgazmo (1997)
 BASEketball (1998)
 South Park: Bigger, Longer & Uncut (1999)
 Terror Firmer (1999)
 Run Ronnie Run! (2002)
 Team America: World Police (2004)
 The Aristocrats (2005)
 Despicable Me 3 (2017)
 South Park: Post Covid (2021)
 South Park: Post Covid: The Return of Covid (2021)
 South Park: The Streaming Wars (2022)
 South Park: The Streaming Wars Part 2'' (2022)
 Untitled Kendrick Lamar film (TBA)

References

External links
 Trey Parker and Matt Stone at the Official South Park Website
 
 

1969 births
Living people
20th-century American male actors
20th-century American singers
20th-century American writers
21st-century American comedians
21st-century American male actors
21st-century American singers
21st-century American writers
American animated film directors
American animated film producers
American animators
American comedy musicians
American film producers
American libertarians
American male comedians
American male film actors
American male screenwriters
American male singer-songwriters
American male television actors
American male video game actors
American male voice actors
American music video directors
American male writers
American musical theatre composers
American musical theatre librettists
American musical theatre lyricists
American parodists
American satirists
American surrealist artists
American television directors
American television producers
American television writers
Animation composers
Animators from Colorado
Annie Award winners
Berklee College of Music alumni
Broadway composers and lyricists
Business duos
American deists
Comedy film directors
Drama Desk Award winners
Film directors from Colorado
Grammy Award winners
Laurence Olivier Award winners
Male actors from Colorado
Male critics of feminism
American male television writers
New York Drama Critics' Circle Award winners
Peabody Award winners
Critics of religions
Critics of atheism
Filmmaking duos
Parody musicians
Parody film directors
People from Conifer, Colorado
Primetime Emmy Award winners
Screenwriters from Colorado
Screenwriting duos
Showrunners
Tony Award winners
University of Colorado Boulder alumni
Singer-songwriters from Colorado
The Game Awards winners